The Men's 50 kilometre freestyle competition at the FIS Nordic World Ski Championships 2019 was held on 3 March 2019.

Results
The race was started at 13:00.

References

Men's 50 kilometre freestyle